Sleeping Beauty (alternatively: Cannon Movie Tales: Sleeping Beauty) is a 1987 American/Israeli fantasy film, part of the 1980 film series Cannon Movie Tales. It is directed by David Irving and stars Tahnee Welch, Morgan Fairchild, Nicholas Clay and Sylvia Miles. It is a contemporary version of the classic tale of Sleeping Beauty of the Brothers Grimm and Charles Perrault. Like the other Cannon Movie Tales, the film was filmed entirely in Israel.

Synopsis
A childless Queen (Morgan Fairchild) and her King (David Holliday), are given a magical potion by a kindly elf (Kenny Baker). When the beautiful Princess Rosebud is born, all the fairies in the land are invited to a christening to bestow their gifts upon the child. However, the evil Red Fairy (Sylvia Miles) is left off the guest list because there are only eight golden dinner plates and nine fairies in the kingdom. Enraged, she crashes the christening ceremony and curses the Princess on her sixteenth birthday to prick her finger on the spindle of a spinning wheel and die. The wise White Fairy (Jane Wiedlin), who was tardy and therefore unable to bestow her gift, softens the curse into a magic spell in which the Princess will fall asleep for one hundred years and be awakened by the kiss of true love. The King, finding very little comfort in the White Fairy's promise, orders that all the spinning wheels in the kingdom to be destroyed, except for one which is hidden and seemingly forgotten, to try to save his daughter from the Red Fairy's fearsome curse.

Many years later, all the people in the kingdom are upset because their clothes have dissolved to rags due to the absence of spindles and sewing needles. The King and Queen travel to the far reaches and bring back reams of fabrics. During their absence, the Red Fairy, disguised as an old woman, lures Princess Rosebud (Tahnee Welch) into a secluded old tower room and tricks her into pricking her finger. The evil curse is complete, and Rosebud falls into a deep sleep. The White Fairy uses her magic to put everyone in the castle to sleep and cover the castle in thick vines. One hundred years pass, and a handsome Prince comes to the castle and wakes Rosebud with a kiss, breaking the enchantment. The entire kingdom celebrates their awakening, and Princess Rosebud and her Prince are married and live happily ever after.

Cast
 Morgan Fairchild as the Queen
 Tahnee Welch as the Princess Rosebud
 Nicholas Clay as the Prince Charming
 David Holliday as the King
 Jane Wiedlin as the White Fairy
 Sylvia Miles as the Red Fairy
 Kenny Baker as the Elf
 Shaike Ophir as the Elf Master

Reception
Richard Scheib from Moria.co gave it two stars and wrote: "All of the Cannon Movie Tales were cheaply shot and made. Some of them occasionally emerged okay but the majority did not. Sleeping Beauty is a dreary by-the-numbers run through of the Charles Perrault fairytale. The film pads the original story out somewhat, notably with the introduction of the character of the elf played by Kenny Baker. On the other hand, when it comes to the guts of the fairytale – ie. everything that happens after Rosebud goes to sleep – the film seems indifferent and hurried. It is hard, for instance, to understand what killed all the other heroes trying to rescue the princess when all that prince Nicholas Clay’s quest consists of is brushing through some creepers."

References

External links
 
 
 
 Sleeping Beauty on Lovefilm.com

1987 films
1987 fantasy films
Films about elves
Films about curses
Films about fairies and sprites
Films about royalty
Films based on Sleeping Beauty
Films set in a fictional country
Films shot in Israel
Golan-Globus films
Films produced by Menahem Golan
Cannon Movie Tales
Films produced by Yoram Globus
1980s English-language films